The 1921 Victorian state election was held in the Australian state of Victoria on Tuesday 30 August 1921 to elect the 65 members of the state's Legislative Assembly.

Background
The trigger for the 1921 Victorian election was a dissolution of parliament caused by the Victorian Farmers' Union voting with Labor to defeat Harry Lawson's minority Nationalist government after Lawson, who was also the agriculture minister, had abolished the compulsory wheat pool operating in the state.

Results

Legislative Assembly

|}
Notes:
Nineteen seats were uncontested at this election, and were retained by the incumbent parties:
Nationalist (11): Benambra, Boroondara, Brighton, Bulla, Dalhousie, Gippsland West, Hawthorn, Ovens, Toorak, Walhalla, Waranga
Labor (7): Abbotsford, Carlton, Melbourne, North Melbourne, Port Melbourne, Richmond, Williamstown
Victorian Farmers' Union (1): Wangaratta

Outcome

See also
Candidates of the 1921 Victorian state election
Members of the Victorian Legislative Assembly, 1921–1924
1922 Victorian Legislative Council election

References

1921 elections in Australia
Elections in Victoria (Australia)
1920s in Victoria (Australia)
August 1921 events